"I Cried" is a song written by James Brown and Bobby Byrd. It was originally recorded in 1963 by Tammy Montgomery, better known as Tammi Terrell, for Brown's Try Me Records. It was her first charting single, reaching #99 on the Billboard Hot 100.

James Brown recording
James Brown reused the song's chord progression for his 1966 hit "It's a Man's Man's Man's World". He later recorded "I Cried" himself, released in April 1971 in a version arranged by Dave Matthews that charted #15 R&B and #50 Pop. It was his final single for King Records.

Chart performance

References

Tammi Terrell songs
James Brown songs
Songs written by James Brown
Songs written by Bobby Byrd
1963 singles
1971 singles
1963 songs
King Records (United States) singles